Ungureanu may refer to:

Corina Ungureanu (born 1980), Romanian artistic gymnast who competed internationally between 1993 and 1999
Emil Ungureanu (1936–2012), Romanian chess player
Mihai Răzvan Ungureanu (born 1968), Romanian historian, diplomat and politician
Nicolae Ungureanu (born 1956), retired Romanian football defender
Pavel Vasici-Ungureanu (1806–1881), Romanian physician
Paula Ungureanu (born 1980), Romanian handball goalkeeper
Teodora Ungureanu (born 1960), retired Romanian gymnast who competed at the 1976 Summer Olympics

See also
Ungureanu River, tributary of the Şuşara River in Romania

Romanian-language surnames